Tappan Street station is a light rail station on the MBTA Green Line C branch, located in the median of Beacon Street east of Tappan Street in Brookline, Massachusetts. The station consists of two side platforms which serve the C branch's two tracks. Tappan Street has no bus connections and is not accessible.

Track work in 2018–19, which included replacement of platform edges at several stops, triggered requirements for accessibility modifications at those stops. By December 2022, design for Tappan Street and seven other C Branch stations was 15% complete, with construction expected to take place in 2024.

References

External links

MBTA - Tappan Street
Station from Google Maps Street View

Green Line (MBTA) stations
Railway stations in Brookline, Massachusetts